Tele-rugby (2003) is a 10-minute video art project created by Genco Gulan. The film features two female teams inside a swimming pool, fighting each other over a television, and pushing the television around. Tele-rugby was presented in Museum of Modern Art, Rio de Janeiro.

Tele-rugby is filmed underwater with professional swimmers. Despite what the title may suggest Tele-rugby is not about a sports match but it is about a love and hate relationship with media and especially TV. It depicts the fight for the screen in a new environment.

References

Video art